Riverside South is an urban development project in the Lincoln Square neighborhood of the Upper West Side of Manhattan, New York City. It was originated by six civic associations – The Municipal Art Society, Natural Resources Defense Council, New Yorkers for Parks, Regional Plan Association, Riverside Park Fund, and Westpride – in partnership with real estate developer Donald Trump. The largely residential complex, located on the site of a former New York Central Railroad yard, includes Freedom Place and Riverside Center.

Development of the rail yard site generated considerable community opposition. Trump's 1970s-era proposal was widely opposed and failed to gain traction. In 1982, Lincoln West, a much smaller project, was approved with community support, but the developers failed to obtain financing. Planning for the current project began in the late 1980s. The project was originally designed to include 16 apartment buildings with a maximum of 5,700 residential units,  of studio space,  of office space, ancillary retail space, and a  waterfront park.

Trump sold Riverside South to investors from Hong Kong and mainland China, who began construction in 1997. In 2005, the investors sold the remaining unfinished portions to the Carlyle Group and the Extell Development Company.



60th Street Rail Yard

The land for the development was formerly a rail freight yard owned by the New York Central Railroad, located between 59th and 72nd streets. By 1849 an embankment near West End Avenue, with a span over a tidal lagoon, carried the Hudson River Railroad, later part of New York Central. At the time, much of the current site of Riverside South was still under water. By 1880, what had been river was transformed by landfill into the New York Central Railroad’s vast 60th Street Yard.

In the 1930s, New York City parks commissioner Robert Moses covered New York Central's rail track north of 72nd Street in the vast West Side Improvement project, which also moved rail lines below grade south of 60th Street. The Moses project was bigger than Hoover Dam and created the Henry Hudson Parkway. The adjacent Riverside Park was expanded to the Hudson River in such a way that the park and road look like they are set on a natural slope.

Until the 1970s, the rail yard area was generally industrial. The area was home to a printing plant for The New York Times between 1959 and 1975, as well as ABC television studios. At the same time, public housing extended to West End Avenue (across the street from the printing plant and the TV studios), and the Lincoln Towers redevelopment project extended to the rail yard boundary along Freedom Place. In 1962, the railroad proposed a partnership with the Amalgamated Lithographers Union to build a mixed-use development with 5,300 apartments, Litho City, on a platform over the tracks, with landfill in the Hudson River added for parks and docking facilities. Litho City was conceived as the centerpiece of a grandiose "master plan" for the entire Lincoln Square area. In the late 1960s, there were various proposals by the city's Educational Construction Fund for mixed residential and school projects, also partly on landfill.

New York Central merged with the Pennsylvania Railroad to form Penn Central in 1968 as the rail lines were suffering severe financial difficulties that would ultimately lead to the demise of both. (The rail yard was known as the "Penn Yards" even though Penn Central only owned it for a brief period.) The railroad finally went bankrupt in 1971, and use of the yard for rail activities was abandoned.

Redevelopment plans

Early planning and Lincoln West
After Penn Central declared bankruptcy, its assets were sold off in federal court. Aided by his father's influence, real estate developer Donald Trump first optioned the 59th-72nd Street yards in 1974 for no money down. Following a private meeting with Trump, his father, and Mayor Abraham Beame, the firm that was selling off Penn Central's assets gave the option to Trump because he "seemed best positioned [...] to get rezoning and government financing". Initially, Trump wanted to build up to 20,000 or 30,000 housing units on the site. After objections from the politically powerful Manhattan Community Board 7, which represents the neighborhood that included the rail yard, Trump twice downsized his plans for the yards. One of his proposals was for 12,450 apartments, and it depended on public financing that never materialized. One version had a relocated highway and a pseudo-park.

In 1979, Trump decided against extending his option and Abe Hirschfeld, a longtime friend of Trump's father, took over the agreement. The partnership exercised its option for the land but was unable to obtain financing for the development. Journalist Wayne Barrett, who covered the Penn Central deals for The Village Voice, attributed the lack of interest from banks in part to concessions Macri had made to the city and in part to Trump's behind-the-scenes machinations. Subsequently, in January 1985, Trump bought the rights of the Macri Group for $95 million. This was part of a $115 million expenditure that allowed Trump to gain complete control of the rail yard site.

Television City

In 1985, Trump proposed building a vast complex on the rail yard site, which he called Television City. The complex would feature headquarters for NBC along with television studios. The plan involved  of residential, retail, office, and studio construction, including 7,600 residential units, a parking garage, the largest shopping mall on the East Coast, a hotel, and other spaces.  The centerpiece of the project, designed by Helmut Jahn, was to be a 150-story tower in the middle of the complex, dubbed the "World's Tallest Building." Six other towers, each 76 stories high, would also be built north and south of the 150-story tower. Trump wanted to develop the area immediately: his plan called for Television City to break ground by 1987.

New York Times architecture critic Paul Goldberger wrote that Television City was "woefully simplistic." "Putting huge towers in open space, with little connection to the varied pattern of streets, smaller spaces and different building types of the real city, is to see the city only as an abstraction, as a kind of game board on which you move huge pieces at will," he wrote Carter Wiseman, New York Magazine's architecture critic, agreed with Goldberger. Wiseman wrote that "isolated towers," such as those proposed in Television City, "survive in most of the world’s major cities as reminders to planners that this brand of angst-inducing exclusivity is nasty to live with." Wiseman also complained that the development would overwhelm infrastructure at the 72nd Street/Broadway station of the New York City Subway (now served by the ).

Since the new plan was more than twice the size of the previously approved project, Television City generated fierce opposition. Some Upper West Side residents created a group called Westpride to fight Trump's plan, enlisting notable residents of the area, and raising several hundred thousand dollars to fund the effort. 

Negotiations between Trump and Mayor Ed Koch about NBC's possible relocation to Television City devolved into name-calling. Instead of giving tax breaks to Trump, as he had demanded, Koch gave tax breaks directly to NBC, allowing it to decide where to locate its studios. In response, Trump called on Koch to resign, and Koch compared Trump to "a stuck pig."

To improve his chances of gaining approval, Trump fired Jahn and asked Alexander Cooper, a favorite of both architecture critics and city officials, to redesign the project. Cooper reduced the 150-story tower to 136 stories and relocated it to the southern part of the development. But the modified project still contained roughly the same amount of space, including  each of studio and retail space as well as 7,600 housing units.  The six 72-story towers were replaced with slightly smaller, 45- to 57-story skyscrapers, which line one side of an avenue that would run north-south through most of the development. The new site plan was endorsed by the New York City Department of City Planning, so much so that the City Planning Commission forced an adjacent project, then known as Manhattan West, to conform to Cooper's site plan, which included a block-wide park between 63rd and 64th streets extending east to West End Avenue, beyond Trump's property line. Cooper's version of Television City still failed to satisfy critics. 

In 1987, NBC, fearing delays, decided to continue broadcasting from Rockefeller Center. For the new project, renamed Trump City, Trump announced that 760 units would be designated as affordable units and reserved for the elderly.

During the same period, Community Board 7 and the Municipal Art Society jointly sponsored a planning effort, known as West Side Futures, to preserve the character of the Upper West Side.  In addition to recommending various zoning changes to address "overdevelopment" in the larger area, the study had specific recommendations when it came to the Penn Yards, including an extension of Riverside Park to the south, the Manhattan street grid extended through the site, familiar building types, and development limited to the amount approved for Lincoln West.  Since Trump City bore no resemblance to these recommendations, community members still opposed the plan, despite recent changes.

Some observers contend that the City Planning Commission would never have approved Trump City. But given the Commission's endorsement of Alex Cooper's site plan, the project likely would indeed have been approved, although perhaps not Trump's proposed transfer of development rights from the 20 acres of the site that were in the Hudson River. Omitting the transfer of underwater development rights would still have left Trump City with about 10.8 million square feet of development.

Riverside South plan

In 1989, six civic organizations proposed an alternative plan devised by Daniel Gutman, an environmental planner, and Paul Willen, an architect. To create the park, Trump City's proposed shopping mall would be removed and the elevated West Side Highway would be relocated eastward to grade and buried. A new Riverside Boulevard would curve above the relocated highway, with the park sloping down toward the river.

When Community Board 7 realized that the Civic Alternative met the board's stated criteria for developing the Penn Yards site, it altered the criteria at the urging of their congressman, Rep. Jerry Nadler.

Facing massive financial pressure due to his mounting debts, Trump acquiesced and formed a partnership with his critics, formally the Riverside South Planning Corporation (RSPC). While noting that Trump's abandonment of his original plan came as a surprise, Paul Goldberger, in his appraisal of the final Riverside South plan, wrote that "Riverside South, the huge project planned for the 72-acre former Penn Central rail yards on the Upper West Side of Manhattan, now stands a real chance of being a cause for celebration rather than embarrassment."

With a master plan by Skidmore, Owings & Merrill/Paul Willen, FAIA, the RSPC compromise project was approved in 1992 without the television studios and office space that Trump had substituted for some of the residential space. Aside from a major new park, the community was promised a significant enhancement to Freedom Place, an existing four-block street behind a Lincoln Towers parking garage, including a monument to replace a plaque commemorating the three civil rights workers who were killed in Mississippi in 1964.

Early on, the project faced opposition for being somewhat larger than the previously approved Lincoln West, for increasing traffic on West End Avenue and crowding at the 72nd Street subway station, for including no affordable housing, and because of its association with Trump. Minor objections included potentially blocking all of the westward-facing windows of the Chatsworth, a preexisting apartment building on 72nd Street, as well as views from Lincoln Towers. In addition, residents of 71st Street objected to the extension of their street to Riverside Boulevard, thereby making their cul-de-sac into a through street.

The 71st Street problem was easily solved by placing bollards between the existing cul-de-sac and a new mirror-image cul-de-sac on Riverside South property. Most of the major issues were resolved during the approval process. Trump agreed to slightly reduce the overall project size, to partially fund an expansion of the subway station, to guarantee the affordability of a minimum of 12% of the dwelling units, and that the development would pay for construction and maintenance of the new public park.  However, some people still strongly opposed the project, with Rep. Nadler saying that the public park would be a  "private backyard for the people who live in these buildings."

Construction

Start of construction

With Chase Manhattan Bank demanding repayment, Trump sold controlling interest of the project to a consortium of Hong Kong- and China-based investors called Polylinks International Ltd. Polylinks paid $82 million to Chase to obtain the property, leaving Chase with a $218 million loss. This joint venture finally put in motion the largest private development project in New York City history. Trump remained the public face of the group, and chief marketer, as he has on many other projects, but he lost control. Due to the weak economy, as well as significant community opposition, construction was delayed for several years as lawsuits were resolved and the new investors sought public financing. Trump was accused of political payoffs to Republican State Senate Majority Leader Joseph Bruno in return for the latter's prospective approval of a state low-interest mortgage for the project. The state mortgage was never granted.

The development was delayed repeatedly, with the first building originally slated to start construction in 1995, then in October 1996, and finally in January 1997. With improvement in the development climate, the new investors began construction in 1997, placing the name "Trump Place" in large letters on three buildings. Although Trump ceased his active involvement in the development in 2001, he retained his 30% limited partnership.

The Buildings Department discovered in November 1997 that defective concrete had been used in the capitals of columns supporting the fifth floor of 300 Riverside Boulevard, which had been built to 20 stories high by then. Fearing that the planned 46-story structure might collapse if the building rose to even 30 stories, the City halted construction. Work on 300 Riverside Boulevard resumed in early 1998 after the defective concrete was torn out and new concrete was poured.

West Side Highway relocation
One of the key components of Riverside South is relocating the West Side Highway eastward from a viaduct to a rail-yard-grade-level tunnel between approximately West 70th Street and West 61st Street to facilitate a southward expansion of Riverside Park. The current viaduct between 72nd and 59th Streets is the only remaining section of the West Side Elevated Highway that once ran to the southern tip of Manhattan. The highway closed in 1973 when part of the 1920s- and 1930s-era elevated highway collapsed at 14th Street. Below 34th Street, the proposed replacement, an interstate highway in new landfill known as Westway, was defeated, so in 1988, the state settled on an at-grade boulevard up to 57th Street flanked by a new Hudson River Park.

Robert Moses had proposed relocating the highway between 59th and 72nd streets to grade to facilitate an extension of Riverside Park. But the state rejected that proposal because of the presumed negative effect on development opportunities and because it would violate the Blumenthal Amendment, which prohibited any highway construction that would alter Riverside Park. In 1976, Donald Trump seized on Robert Moses' proposal as a way to enhance his development plans, negating one of State DOT's objections. But cost was still an issue. While the state owned an easement through the site, neither the state nor the city (nor Trump, at that point) owned the land. Although the City could have acquired the land in the 1970s from the bankrupt Penn Central, the City was near bankruptcy itself, and consequently preferred to keep the site in private hands to forestall demands for public expenditure. Trump's proposed 12,000-unit residential development went nowhere. So the state proposed to reconstruct the viaduct through the rail yard site.

With city approval in 1992 of the Riverside South plan, Trump agreed to turn over the land for both the park and the highway relocation. He also agreed to create a public park with private funds. But opponents maintained that any complementary public funding to bury the road would benefit only the developer. And the new mayor and governor declined to immediately relocate the highway because, they argued, relocation would effectively waste the public funds used for the viaduct renovation, which had already begun.  Other opponents were upset by the decision to close the West Side Highway northbound entrance and exit ramps at 72nd Street and fought to deny the highway project any funding, thinking that they could thereby scuttle the entire development.

Nevertheless, planning proceeded, albeit in fits and starts. Approved by the Federal Highway Administration in 2001, the highway plan called for relocating the elevated highway to the grade of the rail yard east of the present alignment, constructing supports for Riverside Boulevard in the form of a tunnel that would enclose the highway's northbound lanes, with the future park beginning above an adjacent tunnel enclosing the southbound lanes and continuing on a slope down to the waterfront. The exit ramp was subsequently closed and, in June 2006, the developer began construction of the northbound tunnel between 61st and 65th Streets. However, the rest of the tunnel remains unfinished.

Opening and new developers
The project was jointly developed by the Trump Organization and Hudson Waterfront Associates, representing the Hong Kong investors.

In 2005, the Chinese investors sold the project, excluding the finished condominiums, to the Carlyle Group and the Extell Development Company. Contending that the sale for $1.76 billion was little more than half what the property was worth, Trump sued his partners, but lost. Carlyle and Extell then sold the three apartment buildings with rental units to Equity Residential.

The Extell project, known as Riverside Center, was approved by the City Council in 2010.

Components

Buildings

The second phase of Riverside South was completed when the housing market improved. Extell completed three buildings: The Avery (100 Riverside Boulevard), a 32-floor, 274-unit tower; The Rushmore (80 Riverside Boulevard), a group of 43-story towers that share sixteen lower floors and contain a combined 289 units; and The Aldyn (60 Riverside Boulevard), a 40-floor condominium buildings. The Riverside Center buildings were approved in November 2010.

Overall, the project consists of 19 apartment buildings, condominiums, and lease properties. , the buildings housed a combined 8,000 people; the area was collectively called "Riverside Boulevard" after its main street, or "The Strip" after its long, narrow shape. Six more towers with a combined 3,000 units, as well as a school, a hotel, retail and restaurant space, and space for a movie theater, had yet to be completed. A  park between the buildings was in the planning stages. Most living units in Riverside South are high-end housing, costing at least $. Per-foot real estate prices for Riverside South housing rose 66% from 2004 to 2014, compared with a 43% increase in real estate on the Upper West Side overall. For instance, baseball player Alex Rodriguez bought a 39th-floor Rushmore condominium for $5.5 million in March 2011, then sold it for $8 million in January 2012.

At the same time, 12% to 20% of the units will be designated as affordable, as required by the City Planning Commission approval of the project. However, some buildings in the development, such as One Riverside Park, came under controversy in 2013 for having separate entrances for affordable-housing residents, despite the legality of such "poor doors" in mixed-housing buildings.

, the last two Riverside South projects were being completed; these projects were the off-centered, 362-unit One West End condominium building, as well as a glass-and-masonry, 616-unit rental building at 21 West End Avenue. The former was slated to have 116 affordable units, while the latter would have 127 affordable units. These two buildings were being built in conjunction with a 700-seat public school and retail spaces, as well as a possible "European-style food market and restaurant". The project's developers, Extell and Carlyle, were planning to sell the remaining three building lots to a Boston-based company, General Investment and Development Companies. In the same year, Collegiate School announced plans to build a new 10-story campus building at 301 Freedom Place South.

 After the 2016 presidential election, petitions from current residents led the owner of the three buildings at 140, 160, and 180 Riverside Boulevard to remove the name "Trump Place" from the facades. Residents cited Trump's offensive behavior during the U.S. 2016 presidential campaign. The residents of the last building named Trump Place voted to remove the Trump name in February 2019.

Parks 

The new  Riverside Park South extends Riverside Park. Phase 1, a  section from 72nd to 68th Streets, was opened in April 2001. Phase 2 comprises a waterfront section from 70th Street to 65th Street. Phase 2, opened in June 2003, has two plazas at 66th and 68th Streets, as well as a jagged waterfront. Phase 3, opened in August 2006, stretches from 65th Street to 62nd Street on the waterfront. Phase 4 opened in 2007 along the waterfront from 62nd to 57th Streets. A new mixed-use bikeway and walkway was also built through the park, linking Hudson River Park with Riverside Park.

The design of Phases 5 and 6, located between the current and future highway alignments, is partly tied to the fate of the highway relocation, the timing of which is still uncertain. The city plans to expand the park with new baseball and soccer fields, bikeways, lawns, picnic areas, and restrooms. To further that plan, the Parks Department has approved a design for the last two sections; construction will start in 2017. Relocating the highway will require some reconstruction of the park.

The park contains site-specific sculptures, railway ruins, gardens, a waterfront promenade, and a walkway. Portions of the former rail yard, such as the New York Central Railroad 69th Street Transfer Bridge, were incorporated into the new park. The transfer bridge was listed on the National Register of Historic Places in 2003. Nearly a dozen rail yard ruins, such as a burnt warehouse frame, were ultimately integrated into the park. As a reminder of the location's history, New York Central Railroad logos are engraved onto park benches. A block away, on West End Avenue, a privately owned park has a remnant of a stone wall, as a remaining part of the embankment that dated to 1847. Construction workers had unearthed the stones during construction in 1994; some stones were salvaged for the new park during the four-day construction hiatus for archaeological excavation.

Other structures
Manhattan Community Board 7 members blamed Trump for failing to build the proposed enhancement and monument at Freedom Place. However, the Riverside South Planning Corporation said that the Freedom Place plan was merely a concept for an arts program that was not included in the final project.

A street called Freedom Place South, along the same axis as Freedom Place, runs southward from 64th Street to 59th Street, where the historic, full-block IRT Powerhouse and Riverside Center building are located. Adjacent to the Powerhouse, and visible from Freedom Place South, is a new tetrahedron-shaped building at 625 West 57th Street, also known as VIA 57 West.

References

External links

 John Morris Dixon, "Riverside South: Civics Lesson," Progressive Architecture, June, 1993, pp. 118–23.
 Paul Willen's history of Riverside South.
 Julia Vitullo-Martin, "The West Side Rethinks Donald Trump's Riverside South," The Manhattan Institute’s Center for Rethinking Development, Newsletter, January, 2004.
 Carter Horsley, "Riverside South Travesty: Politicians kill park component at Trump Development on West Side," The City Review.
 Carter Horsley, "Riverside Drive," The City Review.
 The Waterfront Center Honor Award, 2011.

Apartment buildings in New York City
Multi-building developments in New York City
Residential condominiums in New York City
Residential skyscrapers in Manhattan
Upper West Side
Redevelopment projects in the United States
Donald Trump real estate
Neighborhoods in Manhattan
Manhattan Waterfront Greenway
West Side Line
1997 establishments in New York City
West Side Highway
Riverside Park (Manhattan)